The Antebellum Homes in Eutaw Thematic Resource is a multiple property submission of houses that were listed together on the National Register of Historic Places.  It covers twenty-three  properties in Eutaw, Alabama, all built prior to the American Civil War.

They represent one of the most intact collections of domestic antebellum architecture to survive in the state. All were determined by the National Park Service to be historically or architecturally significant.

See also
National Register of Historic Places Multiple Property Submissions in Alabama
National Register of Historic Places listings in Greene County, Alabama

References

National Register of Historic Places Multiple Property Submissions in Alabama
Antebellum architecture
National Register of Historic Places in Greene County, Alabama